Osteopelta mirabilis is a species of sea snail, a marine gastropod mollusk in the family Osteopeltidae.

Description

Distribution
Chatham Rise and off the Chatham Islands, New Zealand

References

External links
 Bruce Marshall, Deep-sea gastropods from the New Zealand region associated with recent whalebones and Eocene turtle, The Nautilus v 108 (1994–1995)

Osteopeltidae
Gastropods described in 1987